The Holyhead Mountain Hut Circles, also known as 'Tŷ Mawr Hut Circles', Cytiau'r Gwyddelod or the 'Irishmen's Huts', are the remains of a group of Celtic Iron Age huts near Trearddur on Holy Island, Anglesey, Wales. The site is under the care of Cadw and can be visited all year round. The construction of these huts are very similar to those at Din Lligwy, having thick stone walls.

Hut group
The hut group is located on a level terrace that traverses the southwestern end of Holyhead Mountain. The precise age of the hut group is not clear. Much of the site is thought to date from the Iron Age but the settlement may have been in existence over an extended period of time from the Neolithic to the Dark Ages, with different buildings being in use at different times.

Over fifty buildings were recorded when excavations were undertaken in 1860. The site was examined again between 1978 and 1982. About twenty huts have been reconstructed; each would originally have had a conical roof, supported by poles set on top of a low wall, covered with turf or thatch. Some of the huts are homesteads; these are mostly circular and hearths, alcoves and a stone trough have been identified. Others are oval and have a dividing wall, still others are entered by long passages, and some are small, and may have been used as storerooms or workshops. One building at the northeastern end of the terrace has a walled enclosure or paddock adjoining. Artefacts found at the site include a broken stone axe, flint arrowheads and pottery fragments from the late Neolithic or early Bronze Age. Inside one of the huts, a number of Roman coins were concealed.

Access
This is one of the best-preserved hut groups in Wales. The settlement is to the southeast of the South Stack Lighthouse, on the opposite side of the road from a small car park provided by the Royal Society for the Protection of Birds.

The Holyhead Mountain Hut Circles are under the care of Cadw; the site is open to the public, free of charge, throughout the year, except for 24, 25 and 26 December and New Year's Day. Access is by a stone stile over a wall.

See also 

 Bryn Eryr -  the remains of an Iron Age farmstead near Llansadwrn, Anglesey

References

Prehistoric sites in Anglesey
Scheduled monuments in Anglesey
Iron Age sites in Wales
Trearddur